Pattyndenne Manor is a Grade II* listed manor house located near to the village of Goudhurst, Kent.

History
This Grade II* listed timber framed house was built by the Pattyndenn family around 1480, it was a home and a place to hold the Manor court proceedings. In the 16th century it was sold to Sir Maurice Berkeley, son of Lord Berkeley and a Standard-bearer to Henry VIII, Mary Tudor and Elizabeth I.

Structure
The house is built in the local style known as Wealden, in which parts of the upper storey and sides project as jetties, but the central part, has no jetties and thus gives the appearance of being recessed. The central part contains the hall, which would originally have been open to the roof. At Pattydenne 
the upper storey rests on four moulded and chamfered corner posts and the jetties project from all four sides. The layout of the house remains largely unchanged, except for the addition of a tiny kitchen wing in around 1600. In 1890 a small extension was added to accommodate a new staircase.

The house contains a banqueting hall and a 13th-century prison.

Recent events
This house is open to the public.

References

External links

Pattydenne
Buildings and structures in the Borough of Tunbridge Wells